How to Get Ahead in Advertising is a 1989 British black comedy fantasy film written and directed by Bruce Robinson, and starring Richard E. Grant and Rachel Ward. The title is a pun and can be literally taken as "How to Get a Head in Advertising".

Plot
The film is a farce about a mentally unstable advertising executive, Denis Dimbleby Bagley (played by Grant), who suffers a nervous breakdown while making an advert for pimple cream. Rachel Ward plays his long-suffering but sympathetic wife, Julia Bagley. Richard Wilson plays John Bristol, Bagley's boss.

Bagley has a crisis of conscience about the ethics of advertising, which leads to mania. He then develops a boil on his right shoulder that comes to life with a face and voice. The voice of the boil, although uncredited, is that of Bruce Robinson. The boil takes a cynical and unscrupulous view of the advertising profession in contrast to Bagley's new-found ethical concerns. Eventually, Bagley decides to have the boil removed in hospital, but moments before he is taken into the operating room, the boil quickly grows into a replica of Bagley's head (only with a moustache) and covers Bagley's original head, asking doctors to lance it, which is done since nobody has noticed the switch from left to right nor the new moustache.

Bagley, now with the boil head, moustache, and personality (the movie's third personification from Grant after the stressed executive and the raving lunatic) returns home to celebrate his wedding anniversary, with the original head merely resembling a boil on his left shoulder. The "boil" eventually withers but doesn't die, yet Bagley resumes his advertising career rejuvenated and ruthless, although without his wife, who decides to leave his new cruel persona.

Cast

 Richard E. Grant as Denis Dimbleby Bagley
 Rachel Ward as Julia Bagley
 Richard Wilson as John Bristol
 Jacqueline Tong as Penny Wheelstock
 John Shrapnel as Psychiatrist
 Susan Wooldridge as Monica
 Hugh Armstrong as Harry Wax
 Mick Ford as Richard
 Jacqueline Pearce as Maud
 Christopher Simon as Waiter
 Gino Melvazzi as Waiter
 Victor Lucas as Tweedy Man
 Dawn Keeler as Tweedy Woman
 Kerryann White as Girl in Elevator
 Vivienne McKone as Sullivan Bristol Receptionist
 Donald Hoath as Businessman on Train
 John Levitt as Businessman on Train
 Gordon Gostelow as Priest
 Pip Torrens as Jonathan
 Tony Slattery as Basil
 Rachel Fielding as Jennifer
 Pauline Melville as Mrs. Wallace
 Roddy Maude-Roxby as Dr. Gatty
 Francesca Longrigg as Nurse
 Tanveer Ghani as Hospital Doctor
 Joanna Mays as Phillis Blokey
 Sean Bean as Larry Frisk
 Bruce Robinson as the Boil (voice) (uncredited)

Reception

On Rotten Tomatoes the film has an approval rating of 60% based on reviews from 15 critics.

In an interview with Jimmy Kimmel in 2019, Richard E. Grant said that Jim Carrey called him a genius for his work in the film.

The film made £201,972 in the UK.

References

External links
 
 
 
 How to Get Ahead in Advertising an essay by Stanley Kauffmann at the Criterion Collection

1989 films
1980s black comedy films
British satirical films
British black comedy films
HandMade Films films
Films directed by Bruce Robinson
1989 comedy films
1980s English-language films
1980s British films